The Ukrainian Revolutionary Democratic Party was a Ukrainian revolutionary socialist organisation founded by emigres following the Second World War. The founders of the URDP were: Ivan Bagryany, Hryhoriy Kostyuk, Ivan Maistrenko, Borys Levitsky, Semen Pidhainy, and others. They published Vpered (Forward) edited by Ivan Maistrenko.

It was first headed by Hryhoriy Kostyuk, who left in 1948 with a left-wing group (Ivan Maistrenko, Borys Levitsky, Roman Paladiychuk, etc.), which formed a left-wing URDP around the Vpered magazine.

For the longest time, the URDP was headed by its main leader and inspirer, Ivan Bagryany (1948–1963); further Fedor Gaenko (1963–1967), for a short time Mykola Stepanenko (who also left in 1967, creating a separate - "right" URDP), Vasyl Hryshko (1967-1975) and since 1975 - Mykhailo Voskobiynyk.

The program principles of the URDP are based on the struggle against the Soviet regime and the creation of an independent Ukrainian state with a democratic system.

The URDP party is a co-founder and active participant in the activities of the Ukrainian National Council (until 1968), the Congress of Ukrainian Free Political Thought and the Ukrainian Democratic Movement.

URDP activists initiated the formation of the following consonant organizations: the Association of Former Repressed Ukrainians by the Soviet Regime, the Legion of Symon Petliura, and the Association of Democratic Ukrainian Youth.

Printed publications: "Vpered" (magazine of the left wing of the party), "Ukrainian News", "Ukrainian Prometheus", non-periodic magazine "Our Positions" (since 1948).

References

Defunct political parties in Ukraine
Ukrainian political parties in Germany
Political parties with year of establishment missing
Political parties with year of disestablishment missing